The Australian Capital Territory issued revenue stamps from 1966 to 1983 for stamp duty. The first issue had the coat of arms of the territory and had ten values ranging from 5c to $10 in various colours. The second issue was a set of three similar to the first but without watermark. There might have been a conveyance issue in 1990 but no examples have been recorded.

See also
Revenue stamps of Australia

References

Philately of Australia
Australian Capital Territory
Economy of the Australian Capital Territory